= Zabya Khamis al-Muslimani =

Emirati poet and short story writer (born 1958)

Zabya Khamis al-Muslimani (Arabic: ظبية خميس المسلماني) (born 1958) is an Emirati poet and short story writer.

Zabya Khamis al-Muslimani was born in Dubai. From 1975 until 1980 she studied philosophy, political science, and literature at Indiana University; from 1982 to 1989 she studied in London. She was arrested and jailed in Abu Dhabi in 1987 for publishing "transgressive poetry"; as a result, she has lived in Egypt since 1989. Her writing has been anthologized in English.
